Savitri "Savi" Hensman is an activist and writer based in the United Kingdom. She was one of the founders of London's Black Lesbian and Gay Centre.

Early life and education 
Hensman was born in Sri Lanka but moved to the United Kingdom at the age of two, growing up in Hackney. She studied chemical engineering at University College London, graduating in 1982. However, was later unable to find any work in chemical engineering, so instead, joined a lab as a research assistant.

Research and career 
Hensman helped to launch the London's Black Lesbian and Gay Centre in 1985. At the time, the centre was supported by the Greater London Council and housed in an annex of Tottenham Town Hall. In the late 1980s, Hensman joined the Haringey Council's Lesbian and Gay Sub-Committee and was involved with the campaign against Section 28. As well as this, Hensman was involved in the Positive Images group and Haringey Black Action (late 1890s). Hensman worked for many years and is currently an involvement coordinator in health research. As a member of the Christian Church, Hensman campaigns for a more inclusive community, writing on the inclusion of lesbian, gay, bisexual and transgender people in religious communities. In October 2018, she wrote an LGBT briefing paper that was presented to the Archbishop of Canterbury.

Hensman is a regular contributor to Ekklesia, who published her first book in 2015. She has also written for The Guardian, as well as writing poetry.

In 2016, Hensman joined King's College London as the Patient and Public Involvement (PPI) Coordinator for the Collaboration for Leadership in Applied Health Research and Care, South London (CLAHRC). She worked with researchers, service users, carers and communities in order to accumulate research that reflected the views and priorities of local people.

In 2019, Hensman was featured in the University College London (UCL) Queer Tapestry, a project which celebrated the history of UCL's LGBTQ+ community. The tapestry was created by Robert (Bob) Mills, a professor of history of art who leads the LGBTQ+ network.

Books
 Hensman, Savitri and Moriarty, Sarah (1979) Flood at the door

Articles 

 Hensman, Savitri (15 July 2019) Marriage: a leap for methodists, a shuffle for the  Church of England 
 Hensman, Savitri (14 September 2015) Remembering Ken Leech 
 Hensman, Savitri (1 July 2015) Varied Reactions as the Episcopal Church permits same-sex couples to marry 
 Hensman, Savitri (4 April 2015)Jesus and the tomb-dweller: Lifting Death's shadow
 Hensman, Savitri (2 March 2015) Did God make snails? Diversity in creation
 Hensman, Savitri (25 January 2015) Bishops and church collegiality in a postmodern setting 
 Hensman, Savitri (20 December 2014) How do we negotiate the global church sexuality conflict? 
 Hensman, Savitri (3 November 2014) The 'Baby P' case and confession: tackling child protection failings 
 Hensman, Savitri (22 October 2014) Alter Synod, the Catholic Debate on sexuality continues 
 Hensman, Savitri (2 September 2014) Same-sex love, self-denial and the cross 
 Hensman, Savitri (8 July 2014) Church, worldly values, the 'common good' and war 
 Hensman, Savitri (17 April 2014) The Washing of feet: a call to love and a challenge to gender and privilege  
 Hensman, Savitri (17 February 2014) Love, grace and the Bishops' pastoral guidance 
 Hensman, Savitri (11 December 2013) Sexuality, harm and the language of love 
 Hensman, Savitri (17 June 2013) Worship, song and its impact on Christian Imagination 
 Hensman, Savitri (3 June 2013) Parliament's equal marriage debates reveal churches divided 
 Hensman, Savitri (13 May 2013) Caribbean Anglican leaders: homophobia, debating sexuality, upholding human rights 
 Hensman, Savitri (9 April 2013) From Thatcher to Cameron: a cruel legacy 
 Hensman, Savitri (29 March 2013) Buying Enmity: the language of the cross 
 Hensman, Savitri (23 March 2013) Sacrifice or change? The NHS and health after Mid Staffs 
 Hensman, Savitri (5 February 2013) Marriage, Union or Contract? The flawed ResPublica case against equality 
 Hensman, Savitri (19 January 2013) Sri Lanka: farewell to the rule of law?
 Hensman, Savitri (24 December 2012) The Pope, 'the Family' and Christmas 
 Hensman, Savitri (13 December 2012) Equal marriage: churches sharing or burying good news? 
Hensman, Savitri (27 November 2012) Women Bishops: How to move forward?
Hensman, Savitri (16 November 2012) Amid Sri Lanka's poor: the life and death of Michael Rodrigo 
Hensman, Savitri (9 November 2012) Justin Welby: Archbishop amidst fallen idols 
Hensman, Savitri (22 October 2012) Trustworthy leaders or slaughterhouse shepherds? 
Hensman, Savitri (9 October 2012) Anglicans, archbishops and presidential confusions

References 

Sri Lankan activists
Alumni of University College London
Year of birth missing (living people)
Living people
British people of Sri Lankan descent
English LGBT people